Lists of National Treasures of Japan cover different types of National Treasure of Japan. They include buildings and fine arts and crafts.

Buildings and structures
List of National Treasures of Japan (castles), for structures that are part of a castle
List of National Treasures of Japan (miscellaneous structures), for other structures and buildings
List of National Treasures of Japan (residences), for residential buildings and structures
List of National Treasures of Japan (shrines), for structures that are part of a Shinto shrine
List of National Treasures of Japan (temples), for structures that are part of a Buddhist temple

Fine Arts and Crafts
List of National Treasures of Japan (ancient documents), for ancient documents
List of National Treasures of Japan (archaeological materials), for archaeological finds
List of National Treasures of Japan (crafts)
List of National Treasures of Japan (crafts: others), for craft items that are not swords
List of National Treasures of Japan (crafts: swords), for craft items that are swords
List of National Treasures of Japan (historical materials), for historical materials of various type
List of National Treasures of Japan (paintings), for paintings
List of National Treasures of Japan (sculptures), for sculptures
List of National Treasures of Japan (writings)
List of National Treasures of Japan (writings: Classical Chinese books), for Chinese books
List of National Treasures of Japan (writings: Japanese books), for Japanese books
List of National Treasures of Japan (writings: others), for other written materials